Evelyn Anita Stoke-Hayford is the  first Ghanaian to lead the World Food Programme  Executive Board since it was established in 1996.  During  the 3rd Parliament of the 4th republic of Ghana, she was appointed by the late President  John Atta Mills   to serve as  Ghana's ambassador to 5 countries namely,  Italy, Turkey, Greece, Croatia and Slovenia. Stokes - Hayford has also served as Permanent Representative of Ghana to FAO and IFAD.

References 

Ghanaian women ambassadors
Ghanaian diplomats
Living people
World Food Programme people
Ambassadors of Ghana to Turkey
Ambassadors of Ghana to Italy
Ambassadors of Ghana to Greece
Ambassadors of Ghana to Croatia
Ambassadors of Ghana to Slovenia
Year of birth missing (living people)